WDSC (800 AM) is a radio station broadcasting a sports format. Licensed to Dillon, South Carolina, United States, the station is currently owned by iHeartMedia, Inc., through licensee iHM Licenses, LLC.  Its studios are located in Florence, and its transmitter is located south of Dillon.

History
In 1993, WDSC had a sports talk format when it went off the air.

As of 1997, WDSC was owned by Root Communications, Ltd. Qantum Communications Inc. purchased Florence's Root Communications Group LP stations in 2003.

The station was simulcast on WWRK.

On April 11, 2013 WDSC changed their format from gospel to sports, with programming from NBC Sports Radio.

On May 15, 2014, Qantum Communications announced that it would sell its 29 stations, including WDSC, to Clear Channel Communications (now iHeartMedia), in a transaction connected to Clear Channel's sale of WALK AM-FM in Patchogue, New York to Connoisseur Media via Qantum. The transaction was consummated on September 9, 2014.

References

External links

DSC
IHeartMedia radio stations
Sports radio stations in the United States
Radio stations established in 1946
1946 establishments in South Carolina
Fox Sports Radio stations